The Mayor of Lincoln is regarded as the first citizen of the city of Lincoln, England and has precedence in all places within the City, subject to the Royal prerogative.

The Mayor, during their term of Office, remains impartial and is unable to attend or become involved in any political matters. Their full title is "The Right Worshipful the Mayor of Lincoln". 
The position of Mayor of Lincoln was established in 1206.

The following have been mayors of Lincoln:

1379–80: Robert Sutton, MP for Lincoln 11 times between 1381 and 1399
1380–81: Gilbert Beesby, MP for Lincoln, 1382, 1388 and 1401 
1382–83: William Dalderby, MP for Lincoln, 1383 and 1404
1383–84: Robert Saltby, MP for Lincoln, 1383 and 1386
1384–85: William Dalderby, MP for Lincoln, 1383 and 1404 
1386–87: John Sutton, MP for Lincoln 5 times between 1369 and 1388
1387–88: Robert Ledes, MP for Lincoln, 1382, 1391 and 1395
1388–89: Robert Messingham, MP for Lincoln, 1394
1389–90: Seman Laxfield, MP for Lincoln, 1397 and 1404
1390–91: Thomas Thornhagh, MP for Lincoln, 1393
1393–94: Robert Harworth, MP for Lincoln, 1388, 1395 and 1401
1394–95: John Belasise, MP for Lincoln, 1393 and 1411
1399–1400: John Balderton, MP for Lincoln 1402
1401–02: William Blyton, MP for Lincoln, 1399 and 1402 
1402–03: Robert Appleby, MP for Lincoln, 1397 and 1404
1405–06: Nicholas Huddleston, MP for Lincoln, 1404
1407–08: Thomas Forster, MP for Lincoln, 1406, 1413 and 1416
1411–12: Richard Bell, MP for Lincoln, 1407
1412–13: John Ryle, MP for Lincoln, 1414
1416–17: Thomas Archer, MP for Lincoln, 1415 and 1417
1420–21: Thomas Teryng, MP for Lincoln, 1414 
1422–23: William Blyton, MP for Lincoln, 1399 and 1402
1501-02, 1511–12, 1524–25, 1535-36: Robert Alanson, MP for Lincoln, 1512 and 1515
1515: William Sammes, MP for Lincoln, 1529
1522: John Halton, MP for Lincoln, 1523
1527-28, 1541-42: Vincent Grantham, MP for Lincoln, 1529 and 1536
1539-40, 1549-50: William Yates, MP of Lincoln, 1545
1542–43: William Alanson, MP for Lincoln, 1542
1554-55: William Rotheram, MP for Lincoln, 1554
1557–58: Thomas Grantham, MP for Lincoln, 1547
1562-63, 1572–73, 1581-82: William Kent
1867-69 John Richard Battle, Pharmaceutical chemist, druggist & farmer, 1890
1869–70 Joseph Ruston, agricultural engineer, MP for Lincoln, 1884
1878-79, 1879–80, 1883–84, 1884-85: Francis J. Clarke, chemist and creator of Clarke's Blood Mixture
1902-03: Charles Pratt (Liberal Unionist)

21st century
Source: Its About Lincoln
2001–02:  Patricia A McGinley
2002–03:  Gary T Hewson
2003–04:  Donald J Nannestad
2004–05:  Edmund W Strengiel
2005–06:  Adelle Ellis
2006–07:  Stephen A Allnutt
2007–08:  Hilton Spratt
2008–09:  Ronald Hills
2009–10:  David F Gratrick
2010–11: Geoffrey Kirby
2011–12: Kathleen E Brothwell
2012–13: Karen Lee
2013–14: Patrick J Vaughan
2014–15: Brent Charlesworth
2015-16: Andrew Kerry 
2016–17: Yvonne Bodger
2017-18: Chris Burke(811th Mayor of Lincoln)
2018-19: Keith Weaver (812th Mayor of Lincoln) 
2019-21 Sue Burke (813th Mayor of Lincoln) 
(Appointment extended until May 2021 due to the Coronavirus Pandemic

2021-22 Jackie Kirk
2022- Rosanne Kirk

References

Lincoln
 
Lincolnshire-related lists